Kool-Aid is an American brand of flavored drink mix owned by Kraft Heinz based in Chicago, Illinois. The powder form was created by Edwin Perkins in 1927 based upon a liquid concentrate called Fruit Smack.

History

Kool-Aid was invented by Edwin Perkins in Hastings, Nebraska. All of his experiments took place in his mother's kitchen. Its predecessor was a liquid concentrate called Fruit Smack. To reduce shipping costs, in 1927, Perkins discovered a way to remove the liquid from Fruit Smack, leaving only a powder; this powder was named Kool-Aid. Perkins moved his production to Chicago in 1931 and Kool-Aid was sold to General Foods in 1953. Hastings still celebrates a yearly summer festival called Kool-Aid Days on the second weekend in August in honor of their city's claim to fame. Kool-Aid is known as Nebraska's official soft drink.

An agreement between Kraft Foods and SodaStream in 2012 made Kool-Aid's various flavors available for consumer purchases and use with SodaStream's home soda maker machine.

There is an active scene of Kool-Aid collectors. A rare old Kool-Aid package can be traded for up to several hundred dollars on auction websites.

Production
Kool-Aid is usually sold in powder form, in either packets or small tubs. The actual beverage is prepared by mixing the powder with sugar (the packets of powder are usually, though not always, unsweetened) and water, typically by the pitcherful. The drink is usually either served with ice or refrigerated and served chilled. Additionally, there are some sugar-free varieties.

Kool-Aid is also sold as single-serving packets designed to be poured into bottled water, as small plastic bottles with pre-mixed drink, or as such novelties as ice cream or fizzing tablets.

The colors in Kool-Aid will stain, and hence the substance can be used as a dye for either hair or wool.

Advertising and promotion

The Kool-Aid Man, an anthropomorphic pitcher filled with Kool-Aid, is the mascot of Kool-Aid. The character was introduced shortly after General Foods acquired the brand in the 1950s. In television and print ads, the Kool-Aid Man was known for randomly bursting through walls of children's homes and proceeding to make a batch of Kool-Aid for them. His catchphrase is "Oh, yeah!"

Starting in 2011, Kraft began allocating the majority of the Kool-Aid marketing budget towards Latinos. According to the brand, almost 20 percent of Kool-Aid drinkers are Hispanic, and slightly more than 20 percent are African-American.

In 2013, Kraft decided to overhaul the Kool-Aid Man, reimagining him as a CGI character, "a celebrity trying to show that he's just an ordinary guy."

Flavors

In popular culture

"Drinking the Kool-Aid" is a phrase suggesting that one has mindlessly adopted a dogma of a group or a (cult) leader without fully understanding the ramifications or implications. The backdrop of this are events culminating in the 1978 Jonestown Massacre. At Jonestown, Guyana, followers of Jim Jones' Temple drank from a metal vat containing a mixture of "Kool Aid", cyanide, and prescription drugs Valium, Phenergan, and chloral hydrate. Present-day descriptions of the event sometimes claim the beverage was not as Kool-Aid but Flavor Aid, a less-expensive product from Jel Sert reportedly found at the site. Kraft Foods, the maker of Kool-Aid, has stated the same. Implied by this accounting of events is that the reference to the Kool-Aid brand owes exclusively to its being better-known among Americans. Others are less categorical. Both brands are known to have been among the commune's supplies: Film footage shot inside the compound prior to the events of November shows Jones opening a large chest in which boxes of both Flavor Aid and Kool-Aid are visible. Criminal investigators testifying at the Jonestown inquest spoke of finding packets of  "cool aid" (sic), and eyewitnesses to the incident are also recorded as speaking of "cool aid" or "Cool Aid." However, it is unclear whether they intended to refer to the actual Kool-Aid–brand drink or were using the name in a generic sense that might refer to any powdered flavored beverage.

The Electric Kool-Aid Acid Test is a work of literary journalism by Tom Wolfe depicting the life of Ken Kesey and the Merry Pranksters. The book's title is a reference to an acid test in Watts, California, where the Pranksters spiked a batch of Kool-Aid with the psychedelic drug LSD in the 1960s.

Other Kool-Aid products
 Kool-Aid Twists drink mixes (discontinued, some flavors still exist but no longer have the "Twists" moniker on the package)
 Kool-Aid Ice Cream Bars
 Kool-Aid Singles drink mixes
 Kool-Aid Kool Bursts
 Kool-Aid Jammers (juice pouches similar to Capri Sun)
 Kool-Aid Fun Fizz/Pop 'n Drop
 Kool-Pops Freezer Pops
 Kool-Aid Koolers juice boxes (discontinued)
 Kool-Aid Dippers
 Kool-Aid Drink Pitchers
 Kool-Aid Cans
 Kool-Aid Bottles
 Kool-Aid Island Twists drink mixes (discontinued)
 Kool-Aid Mega Mountain Twists drink mixes (discontinued)
 Kool-Aid Fruit T's drink mixes (discontinued)
 Ghoul-Aid Halloween themed drink mixes (revived in 2012)
 Sugar Free Kool-Aid drink mixes
 Kool-Aid Magic Twists drink mixes (discontinued); the powder of the drink mix changed color
 Sharkleberry Fin Kool Pumps (discontinued); was a Burger King promotional item
 Kool-Aid Ice Cool drink mixes (discontinued); gave the drinker a cooling sensation
 Kool-Aid Invisible drink mixes turns the white drink mix powder clear
 Kool-Aid Blast Offs space themed drink mixes (discontinued)

References

External links
 
 The Kool-Aid Story, Adams County Nebraska Historical Society

American soft drinks
Kraft Foods brands
Nebraska culture
Powdered drink mixes
Products introduced in 1927
Soul food